Bingen (1893–1913) was an American Standardbred horse.  A descendant of Hambletonian 10, he is considered one of the most important sires in the development of the modern Standardbred breed.

History
Bingen created a bloodline in the making of the American Standardbred through the Hambletonian 10 offspring Electioneer. Bingen was bred by David Bennet, Lexington. He was broken in by Raymond Snedeker in 1894. George W. Leavitt of Boston and E H Greeley of Ellsworth, Maine, bought him the same year. In 1895 his career as a sire started in Maine. Henry Titer at the Mystic Park Track developed him for racing. The same year he got a new owner in Malcolm Forbes. He was exhibited at the Boston Horse Show in 1897, and won all his classes and was Best in Show all categories. He exclusively operated as a sire in 1899 at Forbes Farm in Massachusetts. In 1904 he was sold in the sale ring, but stayed in Massachusetts. He was sold again and served at different studs in New York between 1909 and 1911. The aging horse got his final owner in David Look, Castleton, Kentucky and was placed in service at the stud from 1912 until his death 1913. His offspring numbered 565.

Pedigree

Tail-male pedigree: May King - Electioneer - Hambletonian.
Tail-female pedigree: Young Miss by Young Jim - Miss Mambrino by Red Wilkes - Miss Clark by Alric - Kate by Clark Chief - Lida by Vandalxx.

Bingen in Sweden
The blood of Bingen was kept alive in Russia through sons exported there. Among them was Gay Bingen and sires of his descendants were imported to Sweden from what at the time was  the Soviet Union (SU). One was Torg, whose offspring numbered 192.

Torg’s tale pedigree: by Guron (SU) dam Gyshpanka (SU) by Gildejets (SU) by Gay Bingen (US)  by Bingen (US).

References

1893 racehorse births
1913 racehorse deaths
American Standardbred racehorses
Racehorses bred in Kentucky
Racehorses trained in the United States
United States Harness Racing Hall of Fame inductees